Michel Peter Lafis (born 19 September 1967) is a Swedish former cyclist. He won the bronze medal in the Men's 100 kilometres team time trial along with Jan Karlsson, Anders Jarl and Björn Johansson at the 1988 Summer Olympics. He also rode at the 1992, 1996 and the 2000 Summer Olympics.

Major results

1987
 2nd National Road Race Championships
1988
 2nd National Road Race Championships
 3rd  Team time trial, Summer Olympics (with Anders Jarl, Björn Johansson and Jan Karlsson)
 4th Overall Tour of Sweden
1990
 2nd National Road Race Championships
1992
 2nd Overall Tour de Liège
 4th Overall Tour of Sweden
1st Stage 4
1994
 2nd Overall Tour of Sweden
1st Stage 1
1995
 1st Stage 4 Grand Prix Guillaume Tell
 2nd Overall Tour of Sweden
1st Stage 3
 3rd National Road Race Championships
 3rd Tour de Berne
1996
 National Road Championships
2nd Time trial
2nd Road race
 4th Overall Tour of Sweden
1997
 1st  National Road Race Championships
1998
 2nd National Road Race Championships
1999
 2nd Circuito de Getxo
2000
 3rd National Road Race Championships

Grand Tour general classification results timeline

References

1967 births
Living people
Swedish male cyclists
Cyclists at the 1988 Summer Olympics
Cyclists at the 1992 Summer Olympics
Cyclists at the 1996 Summer Olympics
Cyclists at the 2000 Summer Olympics
Olympic cyclists of Sweden
Olympic bronze medalists for Sweden
Medalists at the 1988 Summer Olympics
Olympic medalists in cycling
People from Solna Municipality
Sportspeople from Stockholm County
20th-century Swedish people
21st-century Swedish people